Alsager  is a town and civil parish in the unitary authority of Cheshire East in Cheshire, England. It is located to the north-west of Stoke-on-Trent and east of Crewe. The town's population was 13,389 at the 2021 census.

The Mere is a lake in the centre of Alsager; this isolated pool, once the focal point of the town, is only accessible by two fenced public viewing areas and by local residents who have gardens adjoining the waters.

Alsager has hosted an annual summer carnival since 1998; until June 2009, it was located in Milton Park, but it had since moved to the Alsager School playing fields to increase capacity, until moving back to Milton Park in 2017.

In 2008, Alsager was awarded Fairtrade Town status by the Fairtrade Foundation.

History

The civil parish is bordered by the parishes of Betchton to the north, Church Lawton to the north-east and east, Kidsgrove to the south-east, Audley Rural to the south, Haslington to the west, and Hassall to the north-west.

In the village of Church Lawton are the Church Lawton Barrows, which form part of a significant Bronze Age site near the town.

The town's name means 'the cultivated land of a person named Aelle'.

Alsager was recorded as 'Eleacier' in the Domesday Book, and was a small farming village until the 19th century when, due to its rail connections and rural character, it became a home of choice for pottery works managers from the nearby Federation of Six Towns which later became the city of Stoke-on-Trent.

During the Second World War, a large armaments factory was built outside Alsager at Radway Green, and the town expanded dramatically to house the influx of factory workers. Also during the war a camp was constructed for the training of Royal Marines. This bore the name of HMS Excalibur and was situated at the top of Fields Road by the side of the Stoke to Crewe railway line. In 1948 it became a displaced persons camp for refugees from Estonia, Latvia, Lithuania and the former Polish Ukraine, countries which had been forcibly incorporated into the Soviet Union. Many men from these countries had fought on the side of the Germans to try to regain independence, and they were afraid to return to their countries of origin, as many who had returned were executed by the Russians. A school was set up for the education of their children whose only common language when they arrived was German. The school continued to exist for many years in the same set of wooden huts under the name "Excalibur School". The first Roman Catholic church in Alsager was one of the wooden huts and was attended mainly by the Lithuanians, most of whom were Roman Catholic. The Anglican churches are Christ Church (1789), and St Mary Magdalene (1898).

Alsager previously had three Methodist churches at Hassall Road (Wesleyan), Wesley Place (Wesleyan), and Crewe Road (Primitive Methodist). By December 2009 two Methodist churches remained, but today there is just one.

The Roman Catholic community is served from St Gabriel's Church. The parish is located in the Diocese of Shrewsbury (Central Cheshire Region – Local Pastoral Area 9).

Culture

The town is home to Alsager Community Theatre (ACT), an amateur drama group founded in 1973. ACT puts on its productions at Alsager Civic and at nearby Little Moreton Hall.

Alsager Arts Centre, formerly housed on Manchester Metropolitan University's Alsager campus, had a public programme of touring new performances and visual art work presented in two seasons (September–November and January–March). The centre moved to the university's Crewe campus when the Alsager campus closed under the title of the Axis Arts Centre, but closed in spring 2019, because of the planned withdrawal of the university from Crewe. The Arts Centre hosted performance companies such as Forced Entertainment and artists such as Bobby Baker.

Alsager hosts the annual Alsager Music Festival which takes place in Milton Gardens. In August 2010 Alsager hosted the first annual Alsager Arts Festival.  In 2020 the Alsager Music Festival was cancelled due to funding issues caused by requirements for additional security being provided for future events.

Education

Schools
Public education, at primary and secondary school level, is managed by Cheshire East Council and the Alsager Community Trust. The Alsager Community Trust is a co-operative trust, in which all the schools in the town are members. Secondary education is provided by Alsager School, an Academy school, that is situated opposite the former Manchester Metropolitan University campus. It is attended by over 1,300 pupils between the ages of 11 and 18. Alsager School is a Business and Enterprise College.

Six primary schools feed into Alsager School: Alsager Highfields, Cranberry Academy, Excalibur Primary School, Pikemere School, Rode Heath School and St Gabriel's R.C. Primary School.

Former Manchester Metropolitan University

During the Second World War a hostel built of wooden army huts was constructed on the site of the MMU to house workers at the Royal Ordnance Factory, Radway Green, and was called "Heathside". In 1945 it became "Alsager Training College" for the training of teachers which were in short supply at that time. The wooden huts were still in use for housing of students until the early 1960s.
The MMU Alsager was home to the Contemporary Arts and Sports Science Departments of the Manchester Metropolitan University. The University absorbed the former Crewe & Alsager College of Higher Education, forming the Crewe and Alsager Faculty, subsequently renamed MMU Cheshire. The Alsager Arts Centre was also on campus, and promoted touring contemporary dance, music, theatre, live art, performance writing and visual art events to the public as well as members of the University community.

In 2006 the university started transferring staff and departments from Alsager to the Crewe campus, as part of plans for closure of the Alsager site. The Arts Centre also moved to the MMU campus in Crewe, and was renamed the Axis Arts Centre. As of 2012 the entire Alsager campus had long since closed and fallen into disrepair.

In 2015 the former campus on Hassall Road was earmarked for a total of 408 new houses. By early 2018 all of the campus buildings had been demolished and the site cleared. Soon afterwards, construction of a new housing estate named "Scholar's Place" commenced on the site of the former Alsager campus.

Transport
Alsager is close to junction 16 of the M6 motorway.

The town is served by Alsager railway station, with East Midlands Railway services on the Crewe to Derby line and West Midlands Trains services from Crewe to London Euston; both operate hourly during the working day. 

Buses (the number 3) run to Crewe and Hanley every 30 minutes. The 317 bus service links Alsager with Rode Heath, Sandbach and Leighton Hospital hourly and service 318 with Rode Heath and Congleton once every two hours.

The Trent and Mersey Canal runs just to the north-east to the town, forming part of the Cheshire Ring canal walk and the South Cheshire Way footpath. The canal's towpath and the nearby 'Salt Line' are also routes of the National Cycle Network.

Economy

Alsager town centre is characterised by independent and charity shops. The only national chain supermarkets in the town are a medium-sized Asda supermarket and Sainsbury's Local.

There is a BAE Systems Global Combat Systems factory in the nearby village of Radway Green, producing small arms ammunition for the British armed forces.

Developments

Between 2012 and 2021 Alsager town centre has been redeveloped somewhat:The Co-operative Food store was rebuilt and enlarged in 2012, but it was sold off and converted to an Asda supermarket in 2015. A Town Square has been created, Fairview park has been rebuilt and capacity at Fairview Car park has been increased. In April 2014 Cheshire East Council gave planning permission for the development of a new Sainsbury's store on the former Twyfords site off Lawton Road. Sainsbury's are currently reviewing their plans for a large store in the town due to changing patterns in the way people shop, which is currently away from large stores to online shopping and top up shopping at smaller stores. The company along with its rivals have scrapped many major new store schemes throughout the UK.

There are currently proposals to build 1267 new build houses, a new supermarket and petrol station in Alsager.

Sport

Alsager is home to AFC Alsager, Alsager Town F.C., Alsager Bank Corner FC, Linley Tavern FC, The Wood Park Wulruds, Alsager Cricket Club, the Alsager Golf and Country Club, the Alsager Institute Bowling Club, the Alsager Company of Archers, Triton Hockey Club and Alsager Lawn Tennis Club.
 
It also has a number of youth teams in the 'lads'n'dads' league. There is a thriving pool league. There is a swimming club. There is a leisure centre within Alsager, this is managed by Cheshire East Council.

Alsager also hosts the UK's biggest 5 Mile Road Race each year in February. The event attracts many of the UK's top endurance athletes.

On 25 October 2019, the new Alsager sports hub opened on the former MMU campus. The hub contains a pavilion, 5 grass football pitches, a 3G football pitch and a 2G hockey pitch. The hub is home to Triton Hockey Club and AFC Alsager, and is situated on Dunnocksfold Road.

Parks
Alsager has several parks. The town's main park is Milton Garden, which has an ornamental sunken garden, a skatepark, a small children's football pitch and a play area.

Pastimes and leisure pursuits

There is a strong tradition of allotment holding in the town, administered by the Alsager Gardens Association.

Notable people 

 Arthur Lockett (1877–1957) was an English footballer who played for Aston Villa, Preston North End and Stoke City F.C.
 James Lloyd (1905–1974) was an artist, who grew up on a farm in the civil parish.
 William John Branch (1911–1985) was an English professional golfer from Alsager
 Lee Bell (born 1983 in Alsager) is an English former professional footballer who last played as a midfielder for Macclesfield Town, on loan from Burton Albion.
 Shaun Miller (born 1987 in Alsager) is an English professional footballer who plays for League Two club Bolton Wanderers
 Lloyd Saxton (born 1990 in Alsager) is an English footballer who plays for the Swedish football club GIF Sundsvall.
 Rowan Cheshire (born 1995 in Alsager) is a British freestyle skier who represented Great Britain at the 2018 Winter Olympic games.

Nature
Alsager is home to Borrow Pit Meadows, a local beauty spot situated in the north of the town, which leads on to the Salt line. 

The town has woodlands leading to Church Lawton.

Near to the railway station, there is another walkway called Merelake way; this runs alongside Alsager golf course.

Notes

External links

 Alsager Town Council
 

Civil parishes in Cheshire
Towns in Cheshire